Jürgen Litz (born 8 October 1938) is a German rower who competed for the United Team of Germany in the 1960 Summer Olympics.

He was born in Essen.

In 1960 he was a crew member of the West German boat which won the gold medal in the coxed fours event.

External links
 

1938 births
Living people
Olympic rowers of the United Team of Germany
Rowers at the 1960 Summer Olympics
Olympic gold medalists for the United Team of Germany
Sportspeople from Essen
Olympic medalists in rowing
West German male rowers
Medalists at the 1960 Summer Olympics